Sounds from the Far East is a compilation album by Japanese house producer Soichi Terada released by Dutch label Rush Hour on March 23, 2015. The album was compiled by German-born Korean DJ Hunee with appearances from Shinichiro Yokota and Manabu Nagayama. The album includes many long-sought material by Terada and Yokota, including Yokota's "Do It Again," known as Yokota's most popular work, and "Sun Showered," an alternate version of Nami Shimada and Terada's song "Sunshower" which was remixed by Larry Heard and Mark Kamins.

The album came after renewed interest in Japanese house music with the release of "The Far East Transcripts" via the London-based label Hhatri in 2014. Rush Hour's co-founder, Antal Heitlager, reached out to Terada if he was interested in the project, with Terada allowing the project as he took interest. The album's release led to Terada touring and releasing new music.

Composition and recording 
The album includes 12 tracks, split between two vinyl discs with six tracks in each. It includes five tracks from Far East Recording, five tracks from Far East Recording 2, and three tracks from La Ronde, "Got To Be Real", and "Tokyo XXX."

The opening track "Saturday Love Sunday" features a sample of "Saturday Love" by Cherrelle and Alexander O'Neal. Yokota's first track, "Do It Again," sample's "Good Groove" by Derek B. "Sun Showered" is an alternate version of Nami Shimada and Terada's song "Sunshower."

"Low Tension (Alternative Version)" is an alternate mix of "Low Tension," which appeared on La Ronde.

"CPM" includes four samples from "Peanut Butter" by Gwen Guthrie, "Do It to the Music" by Raw Silk, "Keep It Warm (Extended)" by Voices in the Dark, and "Spread Love" by the Fatback Band featuring Evelyn Thomas. "Shake Yours" includes a sample of  "I.C. Love Affair" by Gaznevada. Later versions replaced Yokota's "Shake Yours" with Terada's "We Came Together," or removed the song entirely.

"Purple Haze (Edit)" is an edit of Terada's "Purple Haze" by Hunee, which samples "Purple Haze" by the Jimi Hendrix Experience.

Critical reception 

The album received general positive reviews from critics. Paul Clarke of Resident Advisor gave the album a 3.8/5, calling it the "aural equivalent of Amerikamura" and "just as good as US house and garage." Matt Anniss of Juno Records praised the album, saying that the Far East sound was "warm, rich and expertly melodious, with sun-bright motifs and enveloping pads combining to create cuts that were breezy and almost unashamedly positive."

Track listing

References 

2015 compilation albums